Todo va a cambiar is the second album of the Spanish boy band and 2007 representatives of the Eurovision Song Contest D'Nash, previously known as Nash. The album was released on December 4, 2007 in Spain, preceded by Jimmy Jansson-produced first-single "Amanda" in November. The song is a cover version of a song from this year's Swedish Melodifestivalen composed by Thomas G:sson and has been adapted to Spanish by Tony Sanchez Ohlsson.

Critical reception

The album was received with mixed reactions. MusicaMP3 called "Amanda" simple, while pointing out the album shows how much they have grown since Eurovision.
Zona de Compras:

Track listing 
"Amanda" – 2:48
"Yo por ti, tú por mí" – 3:32
"Hasta que me ames" – 3:22
"En medio de la calle" – 4:15
"Casi" – 3:11
"Esta vez sí" – 4:03
"Todo va a cambiar" – 3:16
"Se me ahoga la vida" – 4:38
"Dale" – 2:47
"Sígueme" – 3:28
"Una vida más" – 3:19
"Loco" – 3:09

Charts, certifications and sales

References

D'Nash albums
2007 albums